BEL can be an abbreviation for:
 The ISO 3166-1 alpha-3 country code for Belgium
 BEL or bell character in the C0 control code set
 Belarusian language, in the ISO 639-2 and SIL country code lists 
 Bharat Electronics Limited, an Indian state-owned aerospace and defence electronics company
 Bellingham (Amtrak station), Washington, United States; Amtrak station code BEL
 Behind Enemy Lines (disambiguation)
 Val de Cães International Airport 3-letter IATA airport code in Belém, Brazil
 The ICAO code for Brussels Airlines, a Belgian airline.

See also
 Bel (disambiguation)
 Bell (disambiguation)
 Belle (disambiguation)